Itthiphol Khunpluem (born 15 December 1973) is a Thai politician.  he serves as Minister of Culture in the second cabinet of Prime Minister Prayut Chan-o-cha.

Early life and education 
Itthiphol is the son of Somchai Khunpluem ("Kamnan Poh") and Satil Khunpluem. He graduated from Assumption College Sriracha and high school from Suankularb Wittayalai School. He graduated with a bachelor's degree Bachelor of Laws from the Faculty of Law,  Chulalongkorn University and master's degree Master of Laws from Golden Gate University, USA.

Political careers 
Itthiphol was a member of the House of Representatives of Chon Buri Province for 2 terms from 2001 until 2008, having served as an advisor to several ministries such as the Ministry of Transport, Ministry of Interior, Ministry of Commerce, Ministry of Science and Technology, and Ministry of Tourism and Sports. Later, he turned to work in local politics by running for election as mayor of Pattaya City and was elected for 2 terms.

In 2018, he joined the Palang Pracharath Party and ran for election in the Chonburi area in the general election of members of the Thai House of Representatives 2019 but was not elected. Later in the year 2019, he was graciously appointed as the Minister of Culture in the government of Prime Minister Prayut Chan-o-cha. In June 2021, he was elected to the executive committee of the Palang Pracharath Party.

Honors and awards 
  Order of the Knights of Rizal - (April 2011)

References 

Living people
1973 births
Place of birth missing (living people)
Itthiphol Khunpluem
Itthiphol Khunpluem
Golden Gate University alumni
Itthiphol Khunpluem
Itthiphol Khunpluem
Itthiphol Khunpluem